The 1949 European Rowing Championships were rowing championships held on the Bosbaan in the Dutch city of Amsterdam. The competition was for men only, they competed in all seven Olympic boat classes (M1x, M2x, M2-, M2+, M4-, M4+, M8+) in late August.

Medal summary – men's events

References

European Rowing Championships
Rowing competitions in the Netherlands
Rowing
Sports competitions in Amsterdam
European Rowing Championships
Rowing